This page shows the results of the Karate Competition for men and women at the 2007 Pan American Games, held from July 26 to July 27, 2007 in the Algodão Gymnasium located in the Miécimo da Silva Sports Complex in Rio de Janeiro, Brazil. The gymnasium has a capacity of 4,000 people.

Men's competition

Kumite (– 60 kg)

Kumite (– 65 kg)

Kumite (– 70 kg)

Kumite (– 75 kg)

Kumite (– 80 kg)

Kumite (+ 80 kg)

Women's competition

Kumite (– 53 kg)

Kumite (– 60 kg)

Kumite (+ 60 kg)

Medal table

References
 Sports 123
 Canadian Olympic Committee

P
2007
Events at the 2007 Pan American Games